Olan (pronounced ) is a dish that is part of the Kerala cuisine of the state of Kerala in South India. It is a light and subtle-flavored dish prepared from white gourd or ash-gourd, and black-eyed peas, coconut milk and ginger seasoned with coconut oil. It is usually served as part of a Sadhya.

Recipe

Kerala style
Ingredients
 Black-eyed beans - 1 cup
 White pumpkin - 1 cup
 Pumpkin - 1 cup
 Green chiles - 3-4
 Coconut milk - 1½ cups
 Curry leaves - 5-6
 Oil - 1 tablespoon
 Salt

Preparation
 Soak the beans overnight.
 Pressure cook until 3/4 done.
 Add chopped pumpkin, salt and slit green chiles.
 Cook with a little water.
 When the pumpkin and the beans are completely cooked, pour hot oil tempered with curry leaves into it.
 Add the coconut milk and simmer for 3–4 minutes.

Varieties
The Nambudiri variety of olan is slightly different.

See also
 Cuisine of Kerala

References

External links 
 nammuderuchikal.com/olan - olan recipe
 Youtube - preparation video

Kerala cuisine